Oriol Roca Batalla (born 30 April 1993) is a professional Spanish tennis player.

Roca Batalla has a career high ATP singles ranking of World No. 193 achieved on 3 August 2015. He also has a career high ATP doubles ranking of World No. 172 achieved on 30 January 2023. Roca Batalla has won 27 ITF singles titles and 47 ITF doubles titles including six Challenger titles. He made it to his first ATP Challenger Tour singles final in Kenitra, Morocco on 19 September 2015.

Roca Batalla made his ATP main draw debut at the 2015 Barcelona Open Banc Sabadell, where he received a wildcard into the doubles event, partnering Gerard Granollers.

Challenger and Futures/World Tennis Tour Finals

Singles: 41 (27-14)

Notes

External links

1993 births
Living people
Spanish male tennis players
Tennis players from Barcelona
21st-century Spanish people